Whippet, formerly Go Whippet, is a bus and coach operator based in Swavesey, Cambridgeshire, England.

History

Whippet Coaches was founded in Huntingdonshire by bicycle salesman Henry Lee in 1919. The first Whippet coach was converted from an American ambulance.

Originally based in the village of Hilton, they moved into a depot at Fenstanton in 1977. In 2009 the company sold these buildings to Stagecoach in The Fens and moved to a depot at Swavesey. In November 2014, the business was sold to Transit Systems, the parent company of London bus company Tower Transit. In October 2018, Go Whippet was sold to the Ascendal Group, owned by Tower Transit's former CEO Adam Leishman.

Whippet used to operate some summer only services to the coast. These have been running in various forms from 1957 up to 2013, and ultimately served Great Yarmouth, Lowestoft, Felixstowe, Clacton-on-Sea and Southend-on-Sea.

Current operations
As of November 2019, Whippet has a fleet of 45 vehicles  buses are run in parts of north Cambridgeshire, including town services in St Neots, and the company also operates a few school and college contracts.

Contracts
In 2014 Whippet started as a contractor for National Express. These services were discontinued in 2020, but the company currently works long-distance services on behalf of FlixBus, operating out of Victoria Coach Station in London to destinations such as Bradford, Bristol, Derby and Swansea.

In the summer of 2018, Whippet unexpectedly withdrew several services in Cambridgeshire, leaving council contracts to other independent operators.

Cambridgeshire busway
From 7 August 2011 until 9 November 2018, Whippet operated service C on Cambridgeshire Guided Busway from Somersham to Cambridge city centre on the section between St Ives and the Cambridge Science Park. This was being run in conjunction with Stagecoach in the Fens (who ran routes A and B) who jointly with Whippet had exclusive use of the route for a period of five years in exchange for providing a minimum service frequency between 07:00 and 19:00 each weekday. Whippet spent a total of £420,000 on three Plaxton Centro  bodied Volvo B7RLE buses that have been sold since and replaced by four Wright Eclipse bodied Volvo B7RLEs. Service C was withdrawn on 9 November 2018, leaving all bus operations on the northern section of the guided busway to Stagecoach East and ending Whippet's services in the St. Ives area.

Whippet launched a new bus service U (for Universal) in Cambridge in July 2016, running originally from Madingley Road Park & Ride (now: Eddington) via West Cambridge to Addenbrooke's Hospital. It is subsidised by the University of Cambridge and replaced the Uni4 service, formerly operated by Stagecoach in Cambridge. The service was rerouted between Cambridge railway station and Cambridge Biomedical Campus via the southern part of the Busway, starting 3 December 2016, after delivery of seven Wright Eclipse bodied Volvo B8RLEs fitted for use on the guided busway.

On 21 June 2017 at approximately 15:48, a Cambridgeshire Guided Busway service, operated by Whippet, derailed near the entrance to the busway at Cambridge railway station. It was travelling towards Addenbrooke's Hospital. The bus crashed into a wall, with damage sustained to the driver's position but there were no serious injuries. Whippet initially blamed cyclists for the accident saying that they had caused the driver to swerve to avoid them. They later deleted those tweets, apologised to the cyclists and dismissed the driver for causing the crash by travelling above the speed limit on the entry to the busway.

In addition to services C and U, in February 2019, Whippet launched a service P (for Pedigree), using the B7RLEs which previously operated on the C, between Cambridge City Centre and Addenbrooke's via the Guided Busway, thus duplicating Stagecoach's A and D services on this section. Service P lasted six months before being withdrawn in August 2019.

References

External links
 
 Official website
 Showbus gallery

Bus operators in Cambridgeshire
Transport companies established in 1919
Transport in Cambridgeshire
1919 establishments in England
Coach operators in England